This is a list of computability and complexity topics, by Wikipedia page.

Computability theory is the part of the theory of computation that deals with what can be computed, in principle. Computational complexity theory deals with how hard computations are, in quantitative terms, both with upper bounds (algorithms whose complexity in the worst cases, as use of computing resources, can be estimated), and from below (proofs that no procedure to carry out some task can be very fast).

For more abstract foundational matters, see the list of mathematical logic topics. See also list of algorithms, list of algorithm general topics.

Calculation

Lookup table
Mathematical table
Multiplication table
Generating trigonometric tables
History of computers
Multiplication algorithm
Peasant multiplication
Division by two
Exponentiating by squaring
Addition chain
Scholz conjecture
Presburger arithmetic

Computability theory: models of computation

Arithmetic circuits
Algorithm
Procedure, recursion
Finite state automaton
Mealy machine
Minsky register machine
Moore machine
State diagram
State transition system
Deterministic finite automaton
Nondeterministic finite automaton
Generalized nondeterministic finite automaton
Regular language
Pumping lemma
Myhill-Nerode theorem
Regular expression
Regular grammar
Prefix grammar
Tree automaton
Pushdown automaton
Context-free grammar
Büchi automaton
Chomsky hierarchy
Context-sensitive language, context-sensitive grammar
Recursively enumerable language
Register machine
Stack machine
Petri net
Post machine
Rewriting
Markov algorithm
Term rewriting
String rewriting system
L-system
Knuth–Bendix completion algorithm
Star height
Star height problem
Generalized star height problem
Cellular automaton
Rule 110 cellular automaton
Conway's Game of Life
Langton's ant
Edge of chaos
Turing machine
Deterministic Turing machine
Non-deterministic Turing machine
Alternating automaton
Alternating Turing machine
Turing-complete
Turing tarpit
Oracle machine
Lambda calculus
Combinatory logic
Combinator
B, C, K, W System
Parallel computing
Flynn's taxonomy
Quantum computer
Universal quantum computer
Church-Turing thesis
Recursive function

Decision problems 

Entscheidungsproblem
Halting problem
Correctness
Post correspondence problem
Decidable language
Undecidable language
Word problem for groups
Wang tile
Penrose tiling

Definability questions

Computable number
Definable number
Halting probability
Algorithmic information theory
Algorithmic probability
Data compression

Complexity theory

Advice (complexity)
Amortized analysis
Arthur–Merlin protocol
Best and worst cases
Busy beaver
Circuit complexity
Constructible function
Cook's theorem
Exponential time
Function problem
Linear time
Linear speedup theorem
Natural proof
Polynomial time
Polynomial-time many-one reduction
Polynomial-time Turing reduction
Savitch's theorem
Space hierarchy theorem
Speed Prior
Speedup theorem
Subquadratic time
Time hierarchy theorem

Complexity classes
See the list of complexity classes

Exponential hierarchy
Polynomial hierarchy

Named problems

Clique problem
Hamiltonian cycle problem
Hamiltonian path problem
Integer factorization
Knapsack problem
Satisfiability problem
2-satisfiability
Boolean satisfiability problem
Subset sum problem
3SUM
Traveling salesman problem
Vertex cover problem
One way function
Set cover problem
Independent set problem

Extensions

Probabilistic algorithm, randomized algorithm
Las Vegas algorithm
Non-determinism
Non-deterministic Turing machine
Interactive computation
Interactive proof system
Probabilistic Turing Machine
Approximation algorithm
Simulated annealing
Ant colony algorithm
Game semantics
Generalized game
Multiple-agent system
Parameterized complexity
Process calculi
Pi-calculus
Hypercomputation
Real computation
Computable analysis
Weihrauch reducibility

Mathematics-related lists
Theory of computation
Outlines of mathematics and logic
Wikipedia outlines